Ddmasar is a village in the Arevut Municipality of the Aragatsotn Province of Armenia. The town is mostly populated by Yazidis.

References

Populated places in Aragatsotn Province
Yazidi populated places in Armenia